Newman Catholic College (formerly Cardinal Hinsley Maths and Computing College ) is an all-boys Catholic school, located in the London Borough of Brent. The school has a student age range of 11–19 years old and is Voluntary Aided. Newman College (before the name change) was founded in 1959. Half of the school's students have English as a second language. The headteacher is Mr Coyle and the Chair of Governors is  Mr Paul O'Shea

Notable staff
Mohamed Mohamud Ibrahim, Deputy Prime Minister of Somalia

Notable alumni
Cyrille Regis
Bashy

Controversies

Bomb threat
On 27 November 2012 students and teachers were evacuated from Newman Catholic College in Harlesden following reports of a bomb in the school's grounds. Police were called to Newman Catholic College in Harlesden Road, Harlesden. Students and staff were evacuated and the surrounding area was cordoned off for public safety while an explosive dog unit was called to search the area. However, nothing was found and the area was reopened at 10:20am. Police have investigated an allegation of malicious communication.

Departure of staff
Of 50 teachers at the Roman Catholic boys' school in Harlesden, 26 left in 2000. Documents obtained by The Guardian include a letter by union representatives to the chairman of governors, John Fox, alleging that the school environment had become "unsafe for pupils and staff".

References

External links
 NCC profile at bbc.co.uk
 NCC profile at teachweb.co.uk
 NCC profile at foxtons.co.uk
 Member of Parliament Sarah Teather visits Newman Catholic College
Department Of Education data for NCC
Ofsted Inspection Data 
Brent Council School Contact

1958 establishments in England
Boys' schools in London
Secondary schools in the London Borough of Brent
Educational institutions established in 1958
Voluntary aided schools in London
Catholic secondary schools in the Archdiocese of Westminster